Terminus is a business and residential complex located in Buckhead, Atlanta, Georgia. The office component of the district is made up of Terminus 200 and Terminus 100. Terminus 100, at the corner of Peachtree Road and Piedmont Road, is the tallest building in Terminus at 485 ft (148 m) tall, and is the 18th-tallest building in Atlanta. Terminus 200 was completed in 2009 and has 22 floors. 10 Terminus Place, the residential component of the complex, is a condominium tower with 32 floors. The name "Terminus" derives from Atlanta's original name, derived from the city's founding as the southeastern terminus for the Western & Atlantic Railroad, although the city was never officially named this.

Tenants 
 PGi

See also 
 List of tallest buildings in Atlanta

References

External links 
 
 

Neighborhoods in Atlanta
Skyscraper office buildings in Atlanta
Residential skyscrapers in Atlanta